Nandi Nyembe (born 19 August 1950) is a South African actress known for her roles in the sports drama Zone 14, and Soul City.

Early life
Nyembe was born in Kliptown, Johannesburg, in August 1950. She also stayed in various places, like Botswana and East London, South Africa when she was young. Nyembe has shared how she used to always be cast as a maid in auditions because of the apartheid regime. In an interview with Bona Magazine she said:

Career
Nyembe is known for playing Nandi Sibiya from 1 until 2012 on Zone 14. She also portrayed the character of Lily on SABC 1's hit teen-drama Yizo Yizo (2001-2004), and the leading character in the SABC 1 sitcom Izoso Connexion, from (2006-2007). She has acted in feature films, including Reasonable Man (1999), Saturday Night at the Palace (1987) and Yesterday (2004).

In 2007, she appeared in the drama series Jacob's Cross, playing the role of Thembe Makhubu. In addition, Nyembe has appeared as a guest in episodes of dozens of primetime series including Soul Buddyz, Hillside, Erfsondes, 4Play: Sex Tips for Girls and a guest starring role in The No.1 Ladies' Detective Agency.

2014–present
In 2006, she also starred in an episode of SABC1 drama series Sticks and Stones, Nyembe has also been a cast member on several television shows, including Mzansi Magic's Isithunzi, Isibaya and The Road for two seasons. In 2016, she was cast in the e.tv drama series Ashes to Ashes. In 2017, Nyembe joined the cast of Mzansi Magic Isithembiso Dolly.

In September 2021, the character she played in the television series House of Zwide was killed off. This led to a string of false reports online that Nyembe had died in real life, and prompted friends to get in touch with her in a panicked state.

Personal life
Nyembe has a daughter. Nyembe practices sangoma (Medium/phycic), she had her sangoma initiation when she was only 17, Before knowing she was a sangoma she suffered a serious illness, as a result of being able to connect with the spirits of people who died on the road. In addition she told Time Lives Magazine about the illness.

 
Nyembe's daughter also practiced sangoma, though she has stopped.

Filmography

Television

References

External links 
 

1950 births
Living people
South African television actresses